Golgo 13 is a 1973 Japanese–Iranian action film directed by Junya Sato, starring Ken Takakura as the international assassin Golgo 13. It is the first live-action movie based on the Japanese manga series Golgo 13. It was filmed almost entirely in the Imperial State of Iran, with an almost entirely Persian supporting cast. It was followed by the film Golgo 13: Assignment Kowloon (1977), starring Sonny Chiba.

Cast
Ken Takakura as Duke Togo/Golgo 13
Mohsen Sohrabi as Aman Jafari
Jaleh Sam as Sheila Jafari
Pouri Banayi as Catherine Morton
Ahmad Ghadakchian as Max Boa

Production

Box office

References

External links
 

1973 films
1970s crime action films
Live-action films based on manga
Golgo 13
Japanese action films
1970s Japanese-language films
Films shot in Iran
Iranian multilingual films
Japanese multilingual films
1970s Persian-language films
1973 multilingual films
Iranian crime films
Films directed by Junya Satō
1970s Japanese films